The Ljubostinja Monastery is a Serbian Orthodox monastery near Trstenik, Serbia. Located in the small mountain valley of the Ljubostinja river, the monastery is dedicated to the Holy Virgin.

History
 
The monastery was built from 1388 to 1405. In Ljubostinja were buried Princess Milica, Lazar Hrebeljanović's wife and Nun Jefimija, which after the Battle of Kosovo became a nun along with a number of other widows of Serbian noblemen, who lost their lives in the battles on the river Maritsa and Kosovo Polje. Today, Ljubostinja is a female monastery, which preserves and maintains about fifty nuns. During the rebellion of Kočine, the people were invited on rebellion from the Ljubostinje monastery. After the collapse of rebellion, Turks burned the monastery to revenge the Serbs, and most of the frescoes were destroyed. Also, when the monastery was set on fire, a secret treasure was discovered hidden in the monastery wall behind icons in which the Princess Milica hid their treasure. Among the stolen treasure was located Crown of Prince Lazar, which is now in Istanbul.

Architecture and painting 
 
Monastery Ljubostinja has one dome and narthex. It was built with trimmed stones, while the facade was re-plastered and painted to imitate masonry of stone and bricks. The monastery was built in the Morava Style. The builder is master Rade Borović, whose name is on the threshold of the passage from the narthex to nave. Paintings are only partially preserved, and it was built on two occasions. In the narthex are portraits of Prince Lazar and Princess Milica made by Hieromonk Makarije. From the painting works are still preserved: "Great Holidays," "Passion," "Miracles" ... The church also has a very valuable iconostasis, which was painted by Nikola Marković in 1822.

Ljubostinja was declared a Monument of Culture of Exceptional Importance in 1979, and it is protected by Republic of Serbia.

See also

Monument of Culture of Exceptional Importance
Tourism in Serbia
Cultural Monuments of Rasina District

External links
Serbian unity congress

Notes and references 
 <small>

Serbian Orthodox monasteries in Serbia
Cultural Monuments of Exceptional Importance (Serbia)
Medieval sites in Serbia
Medieval Serbian Orthodox monasteries
1388 establishments in Europe
14th-century Serbian Orthodox church buildings
Christian monasteries established in the 14th century
Christian monasteries established in the 15th century